The Mines and Steel Development Ministry is a Nigerian ministry established in 1985 to encourage development of the country's solid mineral resources.
The Ministry formulates policy, provides information on mining potential and production, regulates operations and generates revenue for the government. Operational departments include Mining cadastre (records of mine locations, ownership etc.),
Geological survey of Nigeria,
Mines inspectorate,
Artisanal and small-scale mining and 
Mining environment.

Organisation 
The Ministry is directed by a Federal Minister and by a Minister of State, both appointed by the President. A Permanent Secretary, who is a career civil servant, assists the Ministers. The Permanent Secretary is responsible for day-to-day operations and for implementation of policy changes. As of December 2009, the Permanent Secretary was Suleiman D. Kassim.

Geological Survey Agency
 

The Nigerian Geological Survey Agency is a Nigerian government agency specialising in the geology and earth sciences of Nigeria.  It falls under the Federal Ministry of Mines and Steel Development. It was created by the Nigerian Geological Survey Establishment Act of 2006, and is a successor to the Geological Survey of Nigeria, which was established in 1919 after the unification of the Northern Nigeria and the Southern Nigeria Protectorates.

Activities
Activities of the agency include:
 geological mapping
 mineral exploration and evaluation
 drilling and technical services
 hydrogeological research
 engineering geological research
 geochemical mapping
It has a subsidiary, NGSA Consult Ltd, which provides consultancy services.

See also
 Nigerian Civil Service
 Federal Ministries of Nigeria

References

External links 
 Official homepage

Mines and Steel Development
Nigeria
Steel industry in Nigeria